Morterone (Valassinese ) is a comune (municipality) in the Province of Lecco in the Italian region Lombardy, located about  northeast of Milan and about  northeast of Lecco. For this record, it competes with the comune (municipality) of Pedesina, which in the past years had even fewer inhabitants.
In 2016, Morterone with its 32 residents became the smallest Italian comune once again.

Morterone borders the following municipalities: Ballabio, Brumano, Cassina Valsassina, Cremeno, Lecco, Moggio, and Vedeseta.

Etymology 
The name Morterone derives from the Latin mortarium (pond) or murtus (myrtle).

Since it lies on the eastern slope of Mount Resegone, in a lush and unspoilt natural basin surrounded by valleys, it would derive its Latin name mortarium (a wooden or stone bowl in which grass, roots, etc. were crushed), for others from mons, with reference to the pastures found there in large numbers.

Geography 
Morterone is situated at the foot of the Pizzo of the same name (a peak that is part of the Resegone), in an area of woods where you can walk along mountain paths. In an isolated position, from a hydrographic point of view it is part of the Taleggio valley (the stream that runs through it is a right tributary of the Enna stream).

Geology 
The Morterone area is also an interesting karst area (caves, dolines, resurgences, gorges); more than forty cavities have been explored between the Morterone valley, the Remola valley and the Palio coast.

Demographics

Population Evolution

Long Term

Short Term

Births and Deaths

Politics

Elections 
On 3 and 4 October 2021 the citizens of Morterone were called to the polls for the 2021 municipal elections. Mayor Dario Pesenti was elected.

Twin Towns 
Morterone is twinned with:

  Brumano, Italy (2007)

Municipality

Town Hall 
The Town Hall of Morterone is located at  Piazza chiesa, 1, 23811 within the town.

Opening Hours

Administration

ANAC Compliance 
The Comune has and has had multiple plans for ANAC Compliance. It consists of calls for contracts and tender and datasets for both 2020 and 2019.

Staffing 
The Mayor, the Deputy Mayor and the Councillor of Morterone with the indication of the party they belong to or the political coalition at the time of the last municipal elections.

References

Bibliography 

 Annalisa Borghese, Morterone, in Il territorio lariano e i suoi comuni, Milano, Editoriale del Drago, 1992, p. 322.
 Antonio Carminati e Costantino Locatelli, Morterone, sedici racconti di vita contadina sulle pendici del Resegone, 2007, No ISBN

External links 
 Official Site
 Istat Data

Cities and towns in Lombardy